Marvik is a village in Suldal municipality in Rogaland county, Norway.  The village is located along the Sandsfjorden on the southern coast of the Ropeid peninsula.  The village is a commercial centre of the peninsula, having a general store, primary school, marina, library, and Marvik Chapel.

The Sandsfjord Bridge lies a short distance east of Marvik. It opened in 2016.

References

Villages in Rogaland
Suldal